2,4,6-Trichlorophenol, also known as TCP, phenaclor, Dowicide 2S, Dowcide 2S, omal, is a chlorinated phenol that has been used as a fungicide, herbicide, insecticide, antiseptic, defoliant, and glue preservative. It is a clear to yellowish crystalline solid with a strong, phenolic odor. It decomposes on heating to produce toxic and corrosive fumes including hydrogen chloride and chlorine.

Preparation 
2,4,6-Trichlorophenol is produced industrially by the electrophilic chlorination of phenol:

Health effects 
In animal models, consumption of 2,4,6-trichlorophenol leads to an increased incidence of lymphomas, leukemia, and liver cancer. It is classified as Group B2 (probable human carcinogen) by the United States Environmental Protection Agency. The technical grade of this substance may contain polychlorinated dibenzodioxins (PCDDs), polychlorinated dibenzofurans (PCDFs), and other contaminants.

Environmental effects
2,4,6-Trichlorophenol is an environmental pollutant that has been found in fresh water lakes such as the Great Lakes.

See also
Trichlorophenol (for other isomers).

References

External links
International Chemical Safety Card 1122
Compound Summary

Disinfectants
Chlorobenzenes
Phenols